Kırkkavak (literally "forty poplar trees") is a Turkish place name and it may refer to
Kırkkavak, Güdül - a village in Güdül district of Ankara Province
Kırkkavak, Manavgat - a village in Manavgat district of Antalya Province
Kırkkavak, Uzunköprü - a village in Uzunköprü district of Edirne Province
Kırkkavak, Mut - a village in Mut district of Mersin Province